Darnell Terrell Valentine (born February 3, 1959) is an American former professional basketball player who played ten seasons in the National Basketball Association (NBA).

Early life
Valentine was born in Chicago, Illinois and graduated from Wichita Heights High School in Wichita, Kansas, in 1977.

College
He played college basketball at the University of Kansas where he was a three-time Academic All-American and was a member of the 1980 Summer Olympics men's basketball team. The team was unable to compete due to the 1980 Summer Olympics boycott. He did however receive one of 461 Congressional Gold Medals created especially for the spurned athletes.

Professional
Selected by the Portland Trail Blazers in the first round (16th pick overall) of the 1981 NBA Draft, Valentine spent  years with the Trail Blazers. In 300 regular season games with Portland, he averaged 9.8 points, 2.3 rebounds and 5.4 assists a game. Valentine also played for the Los Angeles Clippers and the Cleveland Cavaliers during his 10-year NBA career. He owns career averages of 8.7 points, 2.1 rebounds and 5.0 assists in 620 NBA games. After winding up his NBA career, Valentine played three seasons in the Italian Basketball League.

From 1994 to 2004 Valentine served as a Regional Representative for the National Basketball Players Association.  Valentine worked for the Portland Trail Blazers as Director of Player Programs from September 2004 to December 2007. He currently works for Precision Castparts Corp. in Portland.

References

External links
NBA stats @ basketballreference.com

1959 births
Living people
African-American basketball players
All-American college men's basketball players
American expatriate basketball people in Italy
American men's basketball players
Basketball players from Chicago
Basket Rimini Crabs players
Cleveland Cavaliers players
Congressional Gold Medal recipients
Kansas Jayhawks men's basketball players
Los Angeles Clippers players
McDonald's High School All-Americans
Miami Heat expansion draft picks
Pallacanestro Reggiana players
Parade High School All-Americans (boys' basketball)
Point guards
Portland Trail Blazers draft picks
Portland Trail Blazers players
21st-century African-American people
20th-century African-American sportspeople